Laura Robson was the defending champion but lost in the third round to Quirine Lemoine.

Noppawan Lertcheewakarn defeated Kristina Mladenovic in the final, 3–6, 6–3, 6–1 to win the girls' singles tennis title at the 2009 Wimbledon Championships.

Seeds

  Kristina Mladenovic (final)
  Laura Robson (third round)
  Ana Bogdan (second round)
  Noppawan Lertcheewakarn (champion)
  Olivia Rogowska (first round)
  Tímea Babos (semifinals)
  Sloane Stephens (quarterfinals)
  Ajla Tomljanović (first round)
  Christina McHale (first round)
  Camila Silva (third round)
  Silvia Njirić (quarterfinals)
  Heather Watson (first round)
  Tamaryn Hendler (third round)
  Chanel Simmonds (second round)
  Daria Gavrilova (second round)
  Ulrikke Eikeri (first round)

Draw

Finals

Top half

Section 1

Section 2

Bottom half

Section 3

Section 4

References

External links

Girls' Singles
Wimbledon Championship by year – Girls' singles